The ʿAdhaim (العظيم) is a river that originates in the Zagros Mountains in Sulaymaniyah Governorate and joins the Tigris river after  at , some  downstream (east-to-southeast) of Samarra.

The river is fed by rainwater and peak discharge is between January and March.

See also
Adhaim Dam

References 

Rivers of Iraq
Tributaries of the Tigris River